SIIMA Award for Best Lyricist – Telugu is presented by Vibri media group as part of its annual South Indian International Movie Awards, for the best lyrics done by a writer for a Telugu song. The award was first given in 2012 for songs and films released in 2011. Ramajogayya Sastry is the most nominated with 11 nominations and Ramajogayya Sastry and Chandrabose are the most awarded with three times winning the award.

Superlatives

Winners

Nominations 

 2011: Ramajogayya Sastry – "Guruvaram March" from Dookudu
 Chandrabose – "Infatuation" from 100% Love
 Jonnavittula – "Jagadananda Karaka" from Sri Rama Rajyam
 Ananta Sriram – "Chali Chaliga" from Mr. Perfect
 K. Sivadatta – "Gijigadu" from Rajanna
 2012: Bhaskarabhatla Ravi Kumar – "Sir Osthara" from Businessman
 Vanamali – "Amma Ani Kothaga" from Life Is Beautiful
 Devi Sri Prasad – "O Madhu" from Julai
 Ramajogayya Sastry – "Ga Ee Ga Ee Ga Ee" from Eega
 Sirivennela Sitaramasastri – "Jaruguthunnaadi" from Krishnam Vande Jagadgurum
 2013: Ananta Sriram – "Seethamma Vakitlo" from Seethamma Vakitlo Sirimalle Chettu
 Sri Mani – "Aaradugula Bullettu" from Attarintiki Daredi
 Ramajogayya Sastry – "Banthi Poola Janaki" from Baadshah
 Bhaskarabhatla Ravi Kumar – "Top Lesi Poddi" from Iddarammayilatho
 Vanamali – "Padipoya" from DK Bose
 2014: Chandrabose – "Kani Penchina" from Manam 
 Sirivennela – "Nandalala" from Mukunda
 Ramajogayya Sastry – "Nee Kanti Choopullo" from Legend
 Ananta Sriram – "Em Sandeham Ledu" from Oohalu Gusagusalade
 Vanamali – "Sari Povu Koti" from Karthikeya
 2015: Sirivennela Seetharama Sastry– "Itu Itu Itu" from Kanche
 Devi Sri Prasad – "Super Machi" from S/O Satyamurthy
 Ramajogayya Sastry – "O Manishi" from Yevade Subramanyam
 Ramajogayya Sastry – "Rama Rama" from Srimanthudu
 Shivashakti Datta – "Mamatala Thalli" from Baahubali: The Beginning
 2016:Ramajogayya Sastry – "Pranaamam" from Janatha Garage
 Bhaskarabhatla Ravi Kumar – "Oka Laalana" from Jyo Achyutananda
 Chandrabose – "Chusa Chusa" from Dhruva
 Sirasri – "Maranam Adi Tadhyam" from Vangaveeti
 Sri Mani – "Thelusa Thelusa" from Sarrainodu
 2017:Suddala Ashoka Teja – "Vachinde" from Fidaa
 Chandrabose – "Nuvvele Nuvvele" from Jaya Janaki Nayaka
 Ramajogayya Sastry – "Nilavade" from Sathamanam Bhavati
 Siva Shakti Dutta – "Saahore Baahubali" from Baahubali 2: The Conclusion
 Sri Mani – "Bramaramba Ki" from Rarandoi Veduka Chudham*
 2018: Chandrabose – "Yentha Sakkagunnave" from Rangasthalam
 Anantha Sriram – "Inkem Inkem" from Geetha Govindam
 Krishnakanth – "Maate Vinadugaa" from Taxiwaala
 Ramajogayya Sastry – "Peniviti" from Aravinda Sametha Veera Raghava
 Sirivennela Seetharama Sastry – "Mooga Manasulu" from Mahanati
2019: Sri Mani – "Idhe Kadha" from Maharshi
 Sirivennela Seetharama Sastry – "Nee Raka Kosam" from Yatra
 M. M. Keeravani, Dr. K. Rama Krishna & K. Siva Datta – "Rajarshi" from NTR: Kathanayakudu
 Krishna Kanth – "Needa Padadhani" from Jersey
 Chaitanya Prasad – "Priyathama Priyathama" from Majili
 2020: Ramajogayya Sastry – "Butta Bomma" from Ala Vaikunthapurramuloo
 Sirivennela Seetharama Sastry – "The Life of Ram" from Jaanu
 Kittu Vissapragada – "Tharagathi Gadhi" from Colour Photo
 Devi Sri Prasad – "Sarileru Neekevvaru Anthem" from Sarileru Neekevvaru
 Srinivasa Mouli – "Emo Emo" from Raahu
2021: Chandrabose – "Srivalli" from Pushpa: The Rise
 Mittapalli Surender – "Nee Chitram Choosi" from Love Story
 Sri Mani – "Leharaayi" from Most Eligible Bachelor
 Ramajogayya Sastry – "Maguva Maguva" from Vakeel Saab
 Kalyan Chakravarthy – "Amma Song" from Akhanda

References 

South Indian International Movie Awards
South Indian International Movie Awards winners
Indian music awards